This is a list of large sailing vessels, past and present, including sailing mega yachts, tall ships, sailing cruise ships, and large sailing military ships. It is sorted by overall length.
The list, which is in the form of a table, covers vessels greater than about  LOA, which includes overhangs and spars (length on deck or waterline length are other common measures of ship length).

Key

 General
Year: launch/delivery/active
Shipyard: makers of the yacht
LOA: overall length
LOD: length on deck
LWL: waterline length
Beam: width

 Tonnage and displacement
Gross tonnage and displacement are not equivalent and vary depending on the type of ton (e.g. metric or imperial) and how they are calculated. How gross tonnage is calculated has changed somewhat over time, but has always been a measure of cargo space (i.e., it is a measure of the volume of the cargo space), and figures for displacement also can vary because of different standards for loading.

 Current status
Meaning of status column:

 S Sailing today
 F Floating, permanently moored, not sailing
 D Dry dock or equivalent, permanently
 H Historic ship that no longer exists

List

See also

List of motor yachts by length
List of cruise ships
List of longest wooden ships
Sail
List of clipper ships
List of American-Built Extreme Clipper Ships
List of schooners
List of large sailing yachts

References

Further reading

Lists of sailing ships
Sailing vessel